Valentin Mihai Mihăilă (born 2 February 2000) is a Romanian professional footballer who plays as a winger for Serie B club Parma and the Romania national team.

He began his professional career at Universitatea Craiova in 2017, appearing in over 60 matches in the Liga I before signing for Italian team Parma three years later.

Internationally, Mihăilă recorded his full debut for Romania in a 3–2 win over North Macedonia in March 2021. He previously represented the nation at under-18, under-19 and under-21 levels.

Club career

Universitatea Craiova
Mihăilă made his senior debut for Universitatea Craiova on 24 October 2017, aged 17, in a 2–0 away victory over Sepsi OSK counting for the Cupa României. He did not appear in any other match for the Alb-albaștrii during that season, but on 9 August 2018 started in a 1–3 away defeat to RB Leipzig in the UEFA Europa League third qualifying round. His debut in the Liga I came in a 0–1 loss on 29 July 2018, also against Sepsi OSK. 

Mihăilă began to play frequently and on 19 April 2019 recorded his first league goal—and the only of the match—in an away fixture with Astra Giurgiu, one of his former youth clubs. He amassed 32 matches all competitions comprised in the 2018–19 campaign, and at the end of the year manager Victor Pițurcă confirmed that Craiova rejected a €5 million bid for the youngster from fellow league team FCSB. During his third season in Oltenia, Mihăilă totalled nine goals and came close to claiming the national championship; his side however lost the final game of the competition 1–3 to title contenders and eventual champions CFR Cluj, on 3 August 2020.

Parma
On 5 October 2020, Italian team Parma announced the signing of Mihăilă on a five-year contract, with "the Yellow and Blues" reportedly paying a transfer fee of €8.5 million for the player. This made him the third-most expensive sale of the Romanian league championship at the time, slightly surpassing his former Craiova teammate Alexandru Mitriță on that place. After recovering from athletic pubalgia, Mihăilă finally made his debut for Parma on 3 January 2021 by coming on as a substitute in a 0–3 Serie A loss to Torino. 

Mihăilă was a starter for the first time on 21 January, and managed to score the equaliser in an eventual 1–2 defeat to Lazio in the Coppa Italia's round of 16. He registered his first league goal on 7 March, in a 3–3 away draw with Fiorentina in which he also assisted Jasmin Kurtić. The following fixture, compatriot Dennis Man provided the pass from which Mihăilă opened the scoring in a 2–0 defeat of Roma. He ended the league season with three goals from 16 appearances, as the club got relegated to the Serie B.

On 31 January 2022, Mihăilă joined Serie A club Atalanta on a five-month loan with an option to buy. He did not impress during his stint in Bergamo, featuring in only seven matches without scoring as his full transfer clause was not activated. After returning to Parma, Mihăilă netted a free kick in the 2–2 Serie B opening draw with Bari on 12 August.

International career
Mihăilă attracted significant media attention after contributing to Romania national under-21 team's victory in a UEFA Euro 2021 qualifier against Finland on 14 November 2019, as he scored a hat-trick and provoked an own goal.

In March 2021, he was called up for the first time to the Romania senior team by coach Mirel Rădoi for the 2022 FIFA World Cup qualifiers against North Macedonia, Germany and Armenia. On the 25th that month, Mihăilă replaced injured Florinel Coman in the first half of the former game and netted in the 3–2 win at the Arena Națională in Bucharest.

Career statistics

Club

International

Scores and results list Romania's goal tally first, score column indicates score after each Mihăilă goal.

Honours
Universitatea Craiova
Cupa României: 2017–18
Supercupa României runner-up: 2018

References

External links

2000 births
Living people
Sportspeople from Târgoviște
Romanian footballers
Association football wingers
Liga I players
CS Universitatea Craiova players
Serie A players
Serie B players
Parma Calcio 1913 players
Atalanta B.C. players
Romania youth international footballers
Romania under-21 international footballers
Romania international footballers
Romanian expatriate footballers
Expatriate footballers in Italy
Romanian expatriate sportspeople in Italy